Zee World  is an English-language Bollywood entertainment pay television channel in South Africa. It was launched on 3 February 2015, as the first English-dubbed Bollywood channel in Africa. It is owned by Zee Entertainment Enterprises.

History 
Owned by Zee Entertainment Enterprises, Zee World was launched as the first English-dubbed Bollywood channel in Africa.

References 

Television channels and stations established in 2015
Zee Entertainment Enterprises
Television stations in South Africa
1992 establishments in South Africa